Lucas Martín Ferraz Vila (born 18 February 1998) is an Argentine professional footballer who plays as a forward for El Ejido, on loan from Argentinos Juniors.

Club career
Ferraz Vila played for the youth sides of River Plate up until 2018, when the forward departed to join Argentinos Juniors' system. After spending the rest of the year with their academy, Ferraz Vila featured in professional football for the first time on 28 January 2019 after coming off the substitutes bench in a Primera División defeat to Colón away from home. In July 2019, after one further game for Argentinos, Ferraz Vila departed on loan to Primera B Metropolitana with Fénix. His first appearance came in a defeat to Almirante Brown on 3 August, before the forward notched his first senior goal against Sacachispas in his next match.

On 2 September 2020, Ferraz Vila was announced as a new loan signing for newly-promoted Segunda División B team El Ejido in Spain.

International career
Ferraz Vila represented Argentina at U17 level whilst with River Plate, notably appearing for them at that level's South American Championship and FIFA World Cup in 2015; winning four caps in total, one of which came in the World Cup in Chile against Australia. He had also made appearances for the U15s at the 2013 South American Championship.

Career statistics
.

References

External links

1998 births
Living people
Footballers from Buenos Aires
Argentine footballers
Association football forwards
Argentine Primera División players
Primera B Metropolitana players
Argentinos Juniors footballers
Club Atlético Fénix players
Segunda División B players
CD El Ejido players
Argentine expatriate footballers
Expatriate footballers in Spain
Argentine expatriate sportspeople in Spain
Argentina youth international footballers